Coleophora diogenes is a moth of the family Coleophoridae. It is found in southern Russia, Turkestan, Uzbekistan and China.

The larvae feed on Nanophyton erinaceum. The larvae initially do not make a case but live inside the fruit. They prepare case only on entering hibernation. The larvae are dull yellow, although young larvae have a pinkish tinge. They reach a length of about 5 mm and can be found from October to the beginning of  November. The case is silky, straight and cylindrical. The valve is three-sided. The case reaches a length of 4.5-5.5 mm and is dark chocolate-brown in color.

References

diogenes
Moths described in 1970
Moths of Asia